The Best of Morecambe & Wise was a compilation programme broadcast on BBC1 on Christmas Night in 1978 in direct competition to the duo's brand new show which was being shown at the same time on Thames Television.

Prior to its broadcast the BBC had publicised the programme heavily as "the very best of" and "at their peak" in an effort to win viewers from the commercial station.  Their departure from the BBC had been greatly publicised and allegiances were tested to their limits with the general public feeling very much in "ownership" of the partnership who had entertained them every Christmas Night since 1969. The programme was made up from highlights of their 1976 and record-breaking 1977 shows and has since been repeated under the title of Morecambe & Wise At The BBC for subsequent broadcasts.

See also
 List of Morecambe and Wise joint appearances

1978 television specials
BBC television sketch shows